Quercus calophylla is a Mesoamerican species of oak tree. It is native to mountain forests of central and southern Mexico, Guatemala, and El Salvador. It has incorrectly been known as Quercus candicans.

Common names include ahuahuaxtl, ahuamextli, encino blanco, encino cenizo, encino de agua, encino papatla, huilocualoni, popocamay, tzacui blanco, and tzaquioco.

Description

Taxonomy
In 2018, it was found that the type specimen of Quercus candicans was actually a misidentified Roldana, a plant in the aster family (Asteraceae). The correct name of this species is Quercus calophylla. Forms placed in Quercus candicans by Trelease do belong here.

Habitat and range
It prefers calcareous soils.

Its range includes the Sierra Madre Occidental of Sonora, Chihuahua, Durango, Sinaloa, and Nayarit states, the Sierra Madre Oriental of San Luis Potosí, Hidalgo, Puebla, and Veracruz, The Trans-Mexican Volcanic Belt of Jalisco, Colima, Michoacán, Guanajuato, Mexico City, and Mexico State, the Sierra Madre de Oaxaca of Oaxaca, the Sierra Madre del Sur of Guerrero and Oaxaca, and the Sierra Madre de Chiapas of Chiapas, Guatemala, and El Salvador.

Conservation
Quercus calophylla has been affected by habitat loss from extensive deforestation across most of its range. Its conservation status is Vulnerable. Strong regeneration has been observed at the edges of disturbed areas with intermediate shade.

References

External links
 photo of herbarium specimen at Missouri Botanical Garden, collected in Michoacán in 1891

calophylla
Trees of Guatemala
Plants described in 1801
Flora of the Central American pine–oak forests
Flora of the Central American montane forests
Flora of the Sierra Madre Occidental
Flora of the Sierra Madre de Oaxaca
Flora of the Sierra Madre del Sur
Flora of the Trans-Mexican Volcanic Belt
Cloud forest flora of Mexico
Oaks of Mexico